Dierry Jean (born 20 April 1982 in Haiti) is a Haitian-born Canadian professional boxer fighting out of Montreal. He currently holds a professional record of 31-2-1.

Professional career 

Jean turned professional in 2006. He is currently managed by Montreal-based Eye of the Tiger Management.

Jean faced Lamont Peterson on January 25, 2014 in Washington, D.C., with Peterson's IBF Light Welterweight championship on the line. Peterson won the fight by unanimous decision, handing Jean his first career loss.

Gambling and alcohol dependence 

In November 2014, Dierry Jean decided to abandon the rings for an indefinite period to settle his addiction to gambling and alcohol. The group Eye of the Tiger Management (EOTTM) announced that the 32-year-old boxer had visited a rehabilitation center to treat a disease that was taking more and more space in the last month. On April 3, 2017, Jean was sentenced to 15 months in jail for robbery and drug possession, following events that incidentally happened in 2014.

Professional boxing record 

|-
| style="text-align:center;" colspan="8"|29 wins (20 knockouts), 2 losses, 1 draw, 0 no contests 
|-  style="text-align:center; background:#e3e3e3;"
|  style="border-style:none none solid solid; "|Res.
|  style="border-style:none none solid solid; "|Record
|  style="border-style:none none solid solid; "|Opponent
|  style="border-style:none none solid solid; "|Type
|  style="border-style:none none solid solid; "|Round
|  style="border-style:none none solid solid;"|Date
|  style="border-style:none none solid solid; "|Location
|  style="border-style:none none solid solid; "|Notes
|-align=center
|Draw
|29-2-1
|align=left| Ricky Sismundo
|SD || 8 ||2016-05-13
|align=left| Metropolis, Montréal, Québec
|align=left|
|-align=center
|Loss
|29-2
|align=left| Terence Crawford
|TKO|| 10 (12)||2015-10-24
|align=left| CenturyLink Center, Omaha, Nebraska
|align=left|For WBO light welterweight title
|-align=center
|Win
|29-1
|align=left| Jerry Belmontes
|UD|| 10 ||2015-06-20
|align=left| Bell Centre, Montreal, Quebec
|align=left|Retained WBC-NABF lightweight title
|-align=center
|Win
|28-1
|align=left| Carlos Manuel Reyes
|KO|| 3 (10) ||2015-03-14
|align=left| Bell Centre, Montreal, Quebec
|align=left|
|- style="text-align:center;"
|Win
|27-1
|align=left| Daniel Ruiz
|TKO|| 5 (12) ||2014-09-27
|align=left| Bell Centre, Montreal, Quebec
|align=left|Retained WBC-NABF lightweight title
|- style="text-align:center;"
|Win
|26-1
|align=left| Mario Perez
|TKO|| 8 (12) ||2014-06-13
|align=left| Pierre-Charbonneau Centre, Montréal, Québec
|align=left|Won vacant WBC-NABF lightweight title
|- style="text-align:center;"
|Loss
|25-1
|align=left| Lamont Peterson
|UD || 12 ||2014-01-25
|align=left| DC Armory, Washington, District of Columbia
|align=left|For IBF light welterweight title
|- style="text-align:center;"
|Win
|25-0
|align=left| Cleotis Pendarvis
|TKO|| 4 (12) ||2013-05-10
|align=left| Buffalo Run Casino, Miami, Oklahoma	
|
|- style="text-align:center;"
|Win
|24-0
|align=left| Juan Jesus Rivera
|TKO|| 2 (12) ||2013-02-16
|align=left| Hilton Lac Leamy, Gatineau, Québec	
|align="left"|Retained WBC-NABF light welterweight title
|- style="text-align:center;"
|Win
|23-0
|align=left| Ivan Cano
|TKO|| 11 (12) ||2012-10-26
|align=left| Holiday Inn, Pointe-Claire, Québec	
|align="left"|Retained WBC-NABF light welterweight title;Won vacant WBA-NABA light welterweight title
|- style="text-align:center;"
|Win
|22-0
|align=left| Lanardo Tyner
|UD|| 12 ||2012-05-19
|align=left| Holiday Inn, Pointe-Claire, Québec	
|align="left"|Won vacant WBC-NABF light welterweight title
|- style="text-align:center;"
|Win
|21-0
|align=left| Ryan Barrett
|TKO|| 3 (8) ||2012-02-18
|align=left| Bell Centre, Montréal, Québec	
|align="left"|
|- style="text-align:center;"
|Win
|20-0
|align=left| Francisco Lorenzo
|UD|| 10 ||2011-10-20
|align=left| Bell Centre, Montréal, Québec	
|align="left"|
|- style="text-align:center;"
|Win
|19-0
|align=left| Wilfredo Negrón
|TKO|| 5 (8) ||2010-11-11
|align=left| Corona Theatre, Montréal, Québec	
|align="left"|
|- style="text-align:center;"
|Win
|18-0
|align=left| Antonio Soriano
|RTD|| 6 (8) ||2010-08-14
|align=left| Bell Centre, Montréal, Québec	
|align="left"|
|- style="text-align:center;"
|Win
|17-0
|align=left| Hugo Armenta
|RTD|| 5 (8) ||2009-11-07
|align=left| Montreal Casino, Montréal, Québec	
|align="left"|
|- style="text-align:center;"
|Win
|16-0
|align=left| Adrian Navarrete
|UD|| 8 ||2009-06-06
|align=left| Montreal Casino, Montréal, Québec	
|align="left"|
|- style="text-align:center;"
|Win
|15-0
|align=left| Fabian Luque
|TKO|| 2 (8) ||2008-10-04
|align=left| Montreal Casino, Montréal, Québec	
|align="left"|
|- style="text-align:center;"
|Win
|14-0
|align=left| Cesar Soriano
|UD|| 8 ||2008-08-01
|align=left| Gare Windsor, Montréal, Québec	
|align="left"|
|- style="text-align:center;"
|Win
|13-0
|align=left| Henry Arjona
|KO|| 6 (8) ||2008-05-03
|align=left| Montreal Casino, Montréal, Québec	
|align="left"|
|- style="text-align:center;"
|Win
|12-0
|align=left| Cristian Chavez
|TKO|| 5 (8) ||2008-03-08
|align=left| Montreal Casino, Montréal, Québec	
|align="left"|
|- style="text-align:center;"
|Win
|11-0
|align=left| Michael Springer
|UD|| 8 ||2008-02-09
|align=left| Montreal Casino, Montréal, Québec	
|align="left"|
|- style="text-align:center;"
|Win
|10-0
|align=left| Anthony Woods
|TKO|| 1 (6) ||2008-01-11
|align=left| Seminole Hard Rock Hotel and Casino, Hollywood, Florida
|align="left"|
|- style="text-align:center;"
|Win
|9-0
|align=left| Saul Corral
|KO|| 1 (4) ||2007-12-01
|align=left| Montreal Casino, Montréal, Québec	
|align="left"|
|- style="text-align:center;"
|Win
|8-0
|align=left| Axel Rodrigo Solis
|UD|| 4 ||2007-10-06
|align=left| Montreal Casino, Montréal, Québec	
|align="left"|
|- style="text-align:center;"
|Win
|7-0
|align=left| Sebastien Hamel
|KO|| 5 (6) ||2007-09-21
|align=left| Colisée, Trois-Rivières, Québec	
|align="left"|
|- style="text-align:center;"
|Win
|6-0
|align=left| Bakary Sako
|TKO|| 4 (6) ||2007-08-03
|align=left| Pierre-Charbonneau Centre, Montréal, Québec	
|align="left"|
|- style="text-align:center;"
|Win
|5-0
|align=left| Ivan Illescas
|UD|| 4 ||2007-05-12
|align=left| Montreal Casino, Montréal, Québec
|align="left"|
|- style="text-align:center;"
|Win
|4-0
|align=left| Mario Alberto Mondragon
|KO|| 2 (4) ||2007-03-19
|align=left| Montreal Casino, Montréal, Québec
|align="left"|
|- style="text-align:center;"
|Win
|3-0
|align=left| Mario Rodriguez
|TKO|| 2 (4) ||2007-03-10
|align=left| Montreal Casino, Montréal, Québec
|align="left"|
|- style="text-align:center;"
|Win
|2-0
|align=left| Stephane Chartrand
|TKO|| 4 (4) ||2007-02-22
|align=left| Club Soda, Montréal, Québec
|align="left"|
|- style="text-align:center;"
|Win
|1-0
|align=left| Stephane Fleury
|UD|| 4 ||2006-12-16
|align=left| Le Medley, Montréal, Québec
|
|- style="text-align:center;"

References

External links 

Living people
1982 births
Canadian male boxers
Haitian emigrants to Canada
Haitian Quebecers
Light-welterweight boxers